Cabrera may refer to:

Places

Colombia 
 Cabrera, Cundinamarca
 Cabrera, Santander

Dominican Republic
 Cabrera, María Trinidad Sánchez
 Loma de Cabrera, Dajabón

Mexico
 Tlalixtac de Cabrera, Oaxaca

Spain
 Cabrera, Balearic Islands, an uninhabited islet
 Cabrera d'Anoia, Catalonia
 Cabrera de Mar, Catalonia
 Castrillo de Cabrera, Castile and León
 La Cabrera, Madrid

Other uses
 Cabrera (surname)
 Cabrera (Santa Maria de Corcó)
 Cabrera Nunatak
 Cabrera River, a river of Colombia
 Cabrera, a synonym of the grass genus Axonopus
 House of Cabrera, Counts of Urgell between 1236 and 1314 
 José Cabrera Nuclear Power Station, in Almonacid de Zorita, near Madrid, Spain

See also
 Cabrero (disambiguation)
 Caprera (disambiguation)
 Torre Cabrera (disambiguation)